Anglophone North is a Canadian school district in New Brunswick, operated under the direction of the Ministry of Education and Early Childhood Development.

Anglophone North is an Anglophone district operating 33 public schools (gr. K-12) in Restigouche County, Gloucester County, Northumberland County and Kent County.  Current enrollment is  7,266 students and 1212 teachers. Its headquarters are located in Miramichi.

List of schools

High schools
 Bathurst High School
 Bonar Law Memorial High School
 Dalhousie Regional High School
 James M. Hill Memorial High School
 Miramichi Valley High School
 North and South Esk Regional High School
 Sugarloaf Senior High School

Middle schools
 Campbellton Middle School
 Dalhousie Middle School
 Eleanor W. Graham Middle School
 Elsipogtog School
 Superior Middle School

Elementary schools
 Janeville Elementary School
 L.E. Reinsborough School
 Lord Beaverbrook School
 Parkwood Heights Elementary School
 Terry Fox Elementary School
 Tide Head School
 Rexton Elementary school

Combined schools
 Jacquet River School
 Blackville School
 Nelson Rural School
 Max Aitken Academy

Other schools
 Bathurst Learning Center
 Campbellton Learning Center
 Dalhousie Learning Center

See also
List of school districts in New Brunswick
List of schools in New Brunswick

References

 

School districts in New Brunswick
Education in Restigouche County, New Brunswick
Education in Gloucester County, New Brunswick